The Mitsubishi Sirius or 4G6/4D6 engine is the name of one of Mitsubishi Motors' four series of inline-four automobile engines, along with Astron, Orion, and Saturn.

The 4G6 gasoline engines were the favoured performance variant for Mitsubishi. The 4G61T powered their Colt Turbo, while the 4G63T, first introduced in the 1980 Lancer EX 2000 Turbo, went on to see service in the Sapporo and Starion coupés during the so-called "turbo era" of the 1980s, before creating for itself an illustrious motorsport heritage as the powerplant under the hood of the World Rally Championship-winning Lancer Evolution. A UK-market Evo known as the FQ400 had a  version of the Sirius, making it the most powerful car ever sold by Mitsubishi.

The 4D6 diesel engines supplemented the larger 4D5. Bore pitch is 93 mm.

4G61 (1.6 liters)
This engine was always DOHC 16-valve and used either Multi-point (MPFI) or Electronic Control (ECFI) fuel injection. A turbocharged version was also produced for the Mirage and Lancer. Unlike the other Sirius motors, the 4G61 does not have balance shafts.

Performance
 4G61  at 6100 rpm.

Applications
 1988–1992 Mitsubishi Mirage / Mitsubishi Colt (MPFI)
 1988–1992 Dodge Colt / Plymouth Colt
 1988–1992 Eagle Summit
 1992–1995 Hyundai Elantra

4G62 (1.8 liters)
The larger 1.8 L 4G62 was an SOHC 8-valve unit for longitudinal rear-wheel drive and all-wheel drive use. It was available either in carburetor form, multi-point fuel injection, or ECI Turbo as found in the Lancer EX 1800GSR or 1800GT, and Cordia GSR.

Applications
 1980–1987 Mitsubishi Lancer EX 1800GSR or 1800GT (A175A)
 1981–1986 Mitsubishi Delica/L300/Express
 1983–1987 Mitsubishi Chariot HR
 1983–1989 Mitsubishi Cordia
 1983–1989 Mitsubishi Tredia
 1984–1988 Mitsubishi Galant/Eterna

4G62T
Turbocharged version of the 4G62

4G63/G63B (2.0 liters) 

The 4G63 was a  version.

Bore x stroke is  SOHC and DOHC were produced. Both versions were available in either naturally aspirated and turbocharged form. For front-wheel drive applications, the turbocharged Sirius' name was changed to "Cyclone Dash". As fitted to the fifth generation Galant  JIS gross were claimed - the output claims later shrank to  - for the turbocharged and intercooled "Sirius Dash 3x2 valve" engine. This version could switch between breathing through two or three valves per cylinder, to combine high top-end power with low-end drivability as well as allowing for economical operation. It was a modification of Mitsubishi MCA-Jet technology which used a secondary intake valve to inject air into the engine for more efficient emissions control. The DOHC version was introduced in 1987 in the Japanese market Galant, and came in turbocharged or naturally aspirated form. It is found in various models including the 1988-92 Mitsubishi Galant VR-4, the U.S. market 1990-1999 Mitsubishi Eclipse, and the Mitsubishi Lancer Evolution I-IX. Later versions also received Mitsubishi's variable valve timing system, MIVEC.

A SOHC carbureted eight-valve version (engine code G63B) was also available in Mitsubishi's pickup trucks (L200, Strada, Mighty Max, Dodge Ram 50) from the eighties until the mid-nineties. It produces  at 5500 rpm in European trim (1989). The SOHC version was also used in Mitsubishi Galant models until 1993.

Also the N33 and N83 Space Wagons and Galant (UK market) received the 4G63, in single-cam sixteen-valve format.

The Mitsubishi Eclipse, Eagle Talon and Plymouth Laser introduced the DOHC turbocharged intercooled version to the U.S. in 1989 through Diamond Star Motors, a joint venture between Mitsubishi Motors and the Chrysler Corporation. From 1990 to late April 1992 came thicker connecting rods and the use of six bolts to secure the flywheel to the crankshaft; May 1992 to 2006 Evolution versions have lighter rods and use seven bolts to secure the flywheel to the crankshaft. They are referred to as the "six bolt" and "seven bolt" engines, respectively.

It has a cast iron engine block and aluminium DOHC cylinder head. It uses multi-point fuel injection, has four valves per cylinder, is turbocharged and intercooled and features forged steel connecting rods.

The final version of the engine was found in Lancer Evolution IX. It was equipped with Mitsubishi's variable valve timing system, MIVEC. This version also had a revised turbocharger, extended reach spark plugs, two-piece rings.

This version is equipped with a TD04 turbocharger.

Racing
Its turbocharged variant, G63T (also sometimes referred to simply as the 4G63), has powered Mitsubishi vehicles in World Rally Championships (WRC) for years in the Lancer EX 2000 Turbo, Galant VR-4, Lancer Evolution, Carisma GT, and Lancer WRC04. It was the powerplant of the Lancer Evolution when Tommi Mäkinen won his four consecutive WRC championships in his Lancer. MHI and T-4 turbos were both used as power for these engines. A 1.7L variant of the 4G63 was also used in a custom made hill-climb McLaren F1(Known as McLaren F1 Evo) made by Komvet Racing.

Applications
 1980–2003 Mitsubishi Galant
 1981–1987 Mitsubishi Lancer EX 2000 Turbo
 1982–1987 Mitsubishi Starion
 1983–1992 Dodge Colt Vista
 1983–1998 Mitsubishi Chariot
 1983–1989 Mitsubishi L200/Mighty Max
 1985–1998 Mitsubishi Delica
 1983–1988 Mitsubishi Cordia
 1983–1988 Mitsubishi Tredia
 1990–1999 Mitsubishi Eclipse
 1992–2007 Mitsubishi Lancer Evolution
 1993–1998 Mitsubishi Pajero
 1994–1998 Mitsubishi RVR
 1997–2000 Mitsubishi Canter
 2002–200? Mitsubishi Lancer
 1999–2005 Mitsubishi Dion
 2003–2005 Mitsubishi Airtrek
 1987–1989 Dodge Ram 50
 1989–1992 Eagle Vista Wagon
 1990–1998 Eagle Talon
 1990–1994 Plymouth Laser
 1996–1999 Proton Perdana
 1998-2007 Mitsubishi Adventure Mitsubishi Freeca Mitsubishi Jolie
 2000-2006 Mitsubishi Kuda
 2001-2014 Mitsubishi Savrin

Hyundai production - also called Hyundai Sirius engine
 1987–1988 Hyundai Stellar (engine code G4CP)
 1992–2005 Hyundai Sonata (engine code G4CP)
 1998–2003 Hyundai Santamo (engine code G4CP)
 2000–2008 Hyundai Santa Fe (engine code G4JS)
 1999-2003 Hyundai Trajet (engine code G4JP)
 2000–2004 Kia Joice (engine code G4CP)
 2000–2005 Kia Optima/Magentis (engine code G4JP)

Chinese production
 2004–2010 Brilliance BS6
 2006 Brilliance BS4
 2007–2015 Great Wall Coolbear
 2009–2012 Great Wall Haval H3
 2009 Landwind X6
 2011–present Landwind X8 4X2 2.0
 2011–2013 Emgrand EC8
 2014–2016 Zotye T600
 2015 BAW Yusheng
 2016–2017 Landwind X7
 2016–present Zotye T700
 2017–present Zotye SR9
 2018–present Beijing BJ2022 Brave Warrior

4G64 (2.4 liters)
Early models were 8-valve SOHC, but a later 16-valve SOHC and DOHC version was also produced. The 4G64 was later also available with gasoline direct injection.
The Chrysler version features fracture-split forged powder metal connecting rods. The DOHC and SOHC 16-valve 4G64 are interference engines, while the SOHC 8-valve 4G64 is a non interference engine.

The 4G64 is a very popular engine in China, where it is still used on the Changfeng Lièbào since 2002, a series of cars based on the Mitsubishi Pajero V20, and the Soueast Delica based on the Mitsubishi Delica van from 1996 to 2013. The 4G64 engine has been produced by Shenyang Aerospace Mitsubishi Motors Engine Manufacturing (SAME), in Shenyang, China where it was assembled through semi-knockdown kits in August 1998 and complete knockdown kits in September 1999. Regular assembling of the engines took place in April 2000.

Applications
 1983–1992 Dodge Colt Vista (AWD only)
 1986–1998 Hyundai Grandeur
 1986–2005 Mitsubishi Triton
 1987–1990 Mitsubishi Sapporo
 1988–2018 Mitsubishi Delica/Van
 1989–1991 Hyundai Sonata
 1990–present Mitsubishi L200
 1990–1992 Dodge Ram 50
 1990–1996 Mitsubishi Mighty Max
 1993–1997 Mitsubishi Chariot
 1993–2003 Mitsubishi Space Wagon
 1996–1999 Mitsubishi Eclipse
 1996–1998 Mitsubishi Magna (codenamed 4G64-S4 and fitted to the TE-TF series)
 1996–2003 Mitsubishi Galant (GDI, European market)
 1997–1999 Mitsubishi Montero Sport (North American, ES model)
 1998–2005 Mitsubishi Montero (V11 - 2 door) Latin America version
 1998–2003 Mitsubishi Space Wagon
 1999–2005 Hyundai Sonata
 2000–2005 Kia Optima
 2000–2005 Mitsubishi Eclipse
 2001–2004 Dodge Stratus Coupe
 2001–2006 Hyundai Santa Fe
 2001 Mitsubishi Airtrek
 2002–present Changfeng Liebao (a series of cars based on the Mitsubishi Pajero V20 from China)
 2003-2006 Kia Sorento 2.4i Manual 
 2003 Mitsubishi Outlander
 2004 Brilliance BS6
 2004–2006 Chery Eastar 
 2004–2015 Hyundai Terracan
 2005–2009 Great Wall Hover (X240 and V240)
 2005 Mitsubishi Zinger
 2007 Landwind X6
 2008–2015 Chery V5
 2006–present Ford Transit/JMC Teshun (Chinese market)

The Chinese market Ford Transit and its successor, the JMC Teshun use the 4G64 engine as a standard petrol option unlike the international version which uses regular Ford engines.

4G64T
Turbocharged version of the 4G64.

4D65 (1.8 liter diesel)
Known as the "Sirius Diesel", the 4D65 has the same dimensions as the 4G62 . It was available either naturally aspirated or turbocharged (with an air-to-air intercooler), and was used in most Mitsubishi diesel passenger cars in the eighties and beginning of the nineties. It was developed specifically to be transversally installed in front-wheel-drive cars, unlike the preceding 4D5-series which remained in production for commercial vehicles. The 1.8 TD power figures are comparable to those of the 22 percent larger, 2.3 liter 4D55, with more low-down torque and while being much smoother. The cast-iron block was typical for Mitsubishi, but unusual for diesel engines, in being equipped with balance shafts. A number of installations combined this engine with four-wheel-drive.

Applications
4D65 (naturally aspirated)
 1983–1987 Mitsubishi Mirage/Colt/Lancer (C14)
 1985–1992 Mitsubishi Mirage/Lancer Van/Wagon (C14/C34)
 1987–1991 Mitsubishi Mirage/Colt/Lancer (C64/C74)

4D65T (turbocharged)
 1983–1989 Mitsubishi Galant/Galant Σ/Eterna Σ (E14)
 1984–1991 Mitsubishi Chariot/Space Wagon (D09W)
 1987–1992 Mitsubishi Galant/Eterna (E34)
 1988–1991 Mitsubishi Lancer (C74, 4WD sedan only)
 1991–1995 Mitsubishi Lancer/Mirage/Libero (CB7, CD7)

4G67 (1.8 liters)
The 16-valve DOHC 4G67 displaced .
Bore x Stroke:

Applications
 1989–1992 Colt/Lancer 1.8 GTI (C58A/C68A)
 1989–1992 Mitsubishi Galant/Eterna (E35A)
 1993–1995 Hyundai Elantra, this engine was called G4CN by Hyundai

4D68 (2.0 liter diesel)

Known as the "Sirius Diesel", the 4D68 version displaces . This engine uses pistons with a static compression ratio of 22.4:1 and piston pins are  OD. It was available either naturally aspirated or turbocharged, and replaced the 4D65 as Mitsubishi's "go-to" diesel.

Type : Diesel engine
Number of cylinders: Inline 4
Combustion chamber: Swirl chamber
Lubrication system: Pressure feed, full-flow filtration
Oil pump type: External gear type
Cooling system: Water-cooled
Water pump type: Centrifugal impeller type
EGR type: Single type
Fuel system: Electronic control distributor-type injection pump
Supercharging: Turbocharger
Rocker arm: Roller type

Applications
 1991-1996 Mitsubishi Mirage/Colt
 1991-1996 Mitsubishi Lancer/Libero
 1992-1997 Mitsubishi Chariot/Space Wagon
 1992-1999 Mitsubishi RVR/Space Wagon
 1996-2000 Mitsubishi Galant/Galant Wagon (Legnum) 
 1996-1999 Mitsubishi Lancer/Libero
 1997-2002 Mitsubishi Mirage/Colt
 1995-2000 Proton Wira 2.0D
 2007-2008 Mitsubishi Triton/L200

4G69 (2.4 liters)

The 4G69 is a  version built in Shiga, Japan and Shenyang, China. It has a cast iron engine block (later switch to aluminum block) and an aluminum SOHC cylinder head. It uses multi-point fuel injection, has 4 valves per cylinder with roller followers and features forged steel connecting rods, a one-piece cast camshaft, and a cast aluminum intake manifold. The 4G69 incorporates Mitsubishi's MIVEC Variable Valve Timing technology.

Mitsubishi ceased any further development and production of Sirius engine after 2012 model year, and its Chinese joint-venture, Shenyang Aerospace Mitsubishi Motors Engine Manufacturing Co., is now the only one producing 4G69 engines. They are used by Chinese manufacturers only, but have been updated to use an aluminum block while adding a timing chain.

Applications
 2003–2008 Mitsubishi Pajero Sport (China)
 2003–2011 Mitsubishi Grandis
 2004–2006 Mitsubishi Lancer
 2004–2006 Mitsubishi Outlander
 2004–2012 Mitsubishi Galant
 2004-2014 Mitsubishi Savrin
 2006–2012 Mitsubishi Eclipse
 2008–present Mitsubishi Zinger (automatic models only)
 2006–2012 Great Wall Wingle 3 
 2007–2010 Great Wall Haval H3 
 2009–2020 Great Wall Haval H5
 2010–present Great Wall Wingle 5
 2011–2013 BYD S6
 2012–present JMC Yuhu
 2011–2014 Emgrand EC8
 Of further note, the Great Wall Haval uses a completely detuned variant offering only  and  
 2014–present Great Wall Wingle 6
 2009–2015 Great Wall Coolbear
 2015–2016 Landwind X6
 2006–2013 Zhongxing Landmark
 2014–present Maxus G10
 2019–present CMC Mitsubishi Delica Van/Pickup
 2019–present Maxus T70

4G6A
 Displacement: 1,798 cc
 Bore × Stroke (mm): 85 × 79.2
 Compression ratio: 9.4:1
 Multi-point intake manifold injection
 Turbocharger model: TD04
 Peak power: 
 Peak torque:  at 2,500 ~ 5,000 rpm
 Minimum fuel consumption rate: 255 g/kw·h

4K1 series
The 4K1 New MIVEC series is based on 4G6 shortblock but mated to a redesigned SOHC 16 valve head with VVL and MIVEC technology. Combustion chambers and piston surfaces were re-engineered to improve fuel economy by lowering friction.
All 4K1 models are naturally aspirated and are currently produced by SAME in Shenyang, China.

4K10 (1.8 liters)
Destroked 4G63 shortblock, same as 4G6A but with the new SOHC MIVEC head.
 Displacement: 1,798 cc
 Bore × Stroke (mm): 85 × 79.2
 Compression ratio: 10.5:1
 Multi-point intake manifold injection
 Peak power:  at 6,000 rpm
 Peak torque:  at 4,000 rpm
 Minimum fuel consumption rate: 245 g/kw·h
 No balance shaft

4K11 (2.0 liters)
Utilized 4G63 shortblock. 
 Displacement: 1,997 cc
 Bore × Stroke (mm): 85 × 88
 Compression ratio: 10.5:1
 Multi-point intake manifold injection
 Peak power:  at 6,000 rpm
 Peak torque:  at 4,000 rpm
 Minimum fuel consumption rate: 245 g/kw·h
 Optional balance shaft

4K12 (2.4 liters)
Utilized 4G69 shortblock.
 Displacement: 2,378 cc
 Bore × Stroke (mm): 87 × 100
 Compression ratio: 10.5:1
 Multi-point intake manifold injection
 Peak power:  at 6,000 rpm
 Peak torque:  at 4,000 rpm
 Minimum fuel consumption rate: 245 g/kw·h
 Standard balance shaft

All 4K1 models are available for both longitudinal and transverse applications.

4K2 series
In 2017, Mitsubishi launched a new series of gasoline inline-four engines called the 4K2 series. Originally consisting of three models, 4K20, 4K21 and 4K22, they are available in naturally aspirated as well as turbocharged versions. This new design is based on the 4G6 shortblock, mated to a newly designed DOHC 16-valve head with MIVEC technology.

The 4K2 series is also produced by SAME in Shenyang, China.

4K20
Destroked 4G63 shortblock, same as 4G6A but with the new DOHC head. Only available as a turbocharged model (4K20D4T).
 Displacement: 1,798 cc
 Bore × Stroke (mm): 85 × 79.2
 Compression ratio: 9.5:1
 Multi-point intake manifold injection
 Peak power:  at 5,500 rpm
 Peak torque:  at 2,000 ~ 4,800 rpm
 Minimum fuel consumption rate: 251 g/kw·h
 Optional balance shaft
 Transverse application only

4K21
4G63 shortblock, available as a turbocharged model (4K21D4T) or two naturally aspirated models (4K21D4M & 4K21D4N)
 Displacement: 1,997 cc (4K21D4T & 4K21D4M)2,019 cc (4K21D4N)
 Bore × Stroke (mm): 85 × 88 (4K21D4T & 4K21D4M)85 × 89 (4K21D4N)
 Compression ratio: 9.4:1 (4K21D4T)10.5:1 (4K21D4M & 4K21D4N)
 Multi-point intake manifold injection
 Peak power:  at 5,600 rpm (4K21D4T) at 6,000 rpm (4K21D4M) at 6,000 rpm (4K21D4N)
 Peak torque:  at 2,000 ~ 4,800 rpm (4K21D4T) at 4,000 rpm (4K21D4M) at 4,000 rpm (4K21D4N)
 Minimum fuel consumption rate: 250 g/kw·h (4K21D4T)242 g/kw·h (4K21S4M)244 g/kw·h (4K21D4N) 
 Optional balance shaft for naturally aspirated models (4K21D4M & 4K21D4N), standard on the turbocharged model (4K21D4T)
 Longitudinal application only

4K22
4G69 shortblock, available as a turbocharged model (4K22D4T) or a naturally aspirated model (4K22D4M)
 Displacement: 2,378 cc
 Bore × Stroke (mm): 87 × 100
 Compression ratio: 9.6:1 (4K22D4T)10.5:1 (4K20D4M)
 Multi-point intake manifold injection
 Peak power:  at 5,600 rpm (4K22D4T) at 6,000 rpm (4K22D4M)
 Peak torque:  at 2,400 ~ 4,000 rpm (4K22D4T) at 4,000 rpm (4K22D4M)
 Standard balance shaft
 Longitudinal application only

See also
 List of Mitsubishi engines
 Hyundai Sirius engine
 List of engines used in Chrysler products

External links

References

 "Engine Epic Part 8 - Mitsubishi Engines", Michael Knowling, Autospeed, issue 48, 21 September 1999

Sirius
Straight-four engines
Diesel engines by model
Gasoline engines by model